Lutterloh is a pattern-drafting system intended for home sewing. It was developed in Germany in the 1930s.

Rather than draft patterns from scratch, the person drafting the pattern refers to a book of diagrams of pattern pieces for garments of various styles and uses a modified system of radial grading to create full-size pattern pieces in the desired size. The system uses a specialized tape measure and ruler with special scales that work with the diagrams in the books.

External links
English language website of Modeverlag Lutterloh

Sewing